The 1977 Firecracker 400 was a NASCAR Winston Cup Series race that took place on July 4, 1977, at Daytona International Speedway in Daytona Beach, Florida.

For the first time since 1949, three women raced in an official NASCAR Cup Series race: Italian Lella Lombardi, Belgian Christine Beckers, and American Janet Guthrie. Lella Lombardi was the only woman to score points in F1 and NASCAR. Lombardi is actually the only F1 driver ever to have a career total of less than one point. One driver scored one-seventh of a point in one season (for sharing a fastest lap, recorded only down to the second, with six others) but scored 51 more in other years.

Race report
A racing grid of 41 drivers competed in this race; including Belgian driver Christine Beckers and Italian Lella Lombardi. D.K. Ulrich would finish last due to an engine problem on the fourth lap. Janet Guthrie was the only American-born female driver on the grid. While A. J. Foyt, Cale Yarborough, Richard Petty and Darrell Waltrip would lead the opening laps of the race, Donnie Allison and Richard Petty would fight it out for supremacy in the crucial final laps.

Lombardi and Beckers were invited by NASCAR with the idea to pit the three women against each other on the track. Lella Lombardi and Christine Beckers raced as teammates in the 24 Hours of Le Mans, finishing just outside the top-10 in their Ford-powered entry, three weeks before this race then raced against each other here.

Richard Petty would go on to defeat Darrell Waltrip by 18 seconds in front of 65,000 people; marking the final win for Richard Petty in his trusty 1974 Dodge Charger. Engine problems knocked most of the drivers out of the race.

There was two-hour rain delay two laps before halfway. There was a storm covering from the tri-oval over the first and second turns for about two hours while the third and fourth turns were in sunshine due to the incessant hot and humid weather of Florida during the summer months.

Most of the vehicles at this event were Dodge or Chevrolet with some Ford vehicles and a single entry by an AMC Matador. Winnings for this race ranged from $19,075 ($ when adjusted for inflation) for the winner to $1,390 for last-place. ($ when adjusted for inflation). Ramo Stott would retire from professional stock car racing after this event.

Qualifying

Results

Standings after the race

References

Firecracker 400
NASCAR races at Daytona International Speedway
Firecracker 400